The 1910 North Carolina A&M Aggies football team represented the North Carolina A&M Aggies of North Carolina College of Agriculture and Mechanic Arts during the 1910 college football season. The Aggies were coached by Edward L. Greene in his second year as head coach, compiling a 4–0–2 record  and tied with Georgetown Hoyas for a Southern championship amongst the South Atlantic teams.

Schedule

References

North Carolina AandM
NC State Wolfpack football seasons
North Carolina AandM Aggies football